Starobalapanovo (İśke Balapan) is a rural locality (a village) in Baimovsky Selsoviet, Abzelilovsky District, Bashkortostan, Russia. The population was 264 as of 2010. There are 5 streets.

Geography 
Starobalapanovo is located 62 km north of Askarovo (the district's administrative centre) by road. Tuishevo is the nearest rural locality.

References 

Rural localities in Abzelilovsky District